Craig Coulson (born 13 June 1967) is an Australian cricketer. He played eleven first-class matches for Western Australia between 1990/91 and 1995/96.

References

External links
 

1967 births
Living people
Australian cricketers
Western Australia cricketers
Cricketers from Perth, Western Australia